The 2021 IIHF World U18 Championship was the 22nd such event hosted by the International Ice Hockey Federation. Teams would have participated at several levels of competition. The competition also would have served as qualifications for the 2022 competition. All tournaments other than the top division tournament were cancelled by the IIHF on November 18, 2020, due to the COVID-19 pandemic. The United States finished without a medal for the first time since 2003.

Top Division
The tournament was held from April 26 to May 6, 2021, in Frisco and Plano, United States.

Officials
The following officials were assigned by the International Ice Hockey Federation to officiate the 2021 World U18 Championships.

Referees
  Adam Kika
  Riku Brander
  Lukas Kohlmüller
  Sergey Yudakov
  Christoffer Holm
  Micha Hebeisen
  Sean Fernandez
  Sean MacFarlane
  Jacob Rekucki
  Stephen Reneau
  Peter Schlittenhardt
  Andrew Wilk

Linesmen
  Nikita Polyakov
  David Klouček
  Tommi Niittylä
  Dāvis Zunde
  Roman Slavikovskii
  Kevin Briganti
  Nick Briganti
  Jake Davis
  William Hancock
  Patrick Richardson

Preliminary round
All times are local (UTC–5).

Group A

Group B

Playoff round
Winning teams were reseeded for the semifinals in accordance with the following ranking:

higher position in the group
higher number of points
better goal difference
higher number of goals scored for
better seeding coming into the tournament (final placement at the 2019 IIHF World U18 Championships).

Bracket

Quarterfinals

Semifinals

Bronze medal game

Gold medal game

Final standings

Statistics

Scoring leaders 

GP = Games played; G = Goals; A = Assists; Pts = Points; +/− = Plus–minus; PIM = Penalties In MinutesSource: IIHF

Goaltending leaders 

(minimum 40% team's total ice time)

TOI = Time on ice (minutes:seconds); GA = Goals against; GAA = Goals against average; SA = Shots against; Sv% = Save percentage; SO = ShutoutsSource: IIHF

Awards
Best players selected by the Directorate:
Best Goaltender:  Benjamin Gaudreau
Best Defenceman:  Aleksi Heimosalmi
Best Forward:  Matvei Michkov
Source: IIHF

Media All-Stars:
MVP:  Matvei Michkov
Goaltender:  Sergei Ivanov
Defencemen:  Aleksi Heimosalmi /  Brandt Clarke
Forwards:  Connor Bedard /  Matvei Michkov /  Samu Tuomaala
Source: IIHF

Division I
All division group tournaments were cancelled by the IIHF.

Group A
The tournament was to be held in Spišská Nová Ves, Slovakia, from April 5 to 11, 2021.

Group B
The tournament was to be held in Asiago, Italy, from April 18 to 25, 2021.

Division II

Group A
The tournament was to be held in Tallinn, Estonia, from April 4 to 10, 2021.

Group B
The tournament was to be held in Sofia, Bulgaria, from March 21 to 27, 2021,

Division III

Group A
The tournament was to be held in Istanbul, Turkey, from March 29 to April 4, 2021.

Group B
The tournament was to be held in Kockelscheuer, Luxembourg, from March 28 to April 3, 2021.

References 

2021 IIHF World U18 Championships
2021 in ice hockey
IIHF World U18 Championships
International ice hockey competitions hosted by the United States
2020–21 in American ice hockey
International sports competitions in Texas
IIHF World U18 Championships
IIHF World U18 Championships